The 147th Mixed Brigade was a unit of the Spanish Republican Army that participated in the Spanish Civil War, deployed on the Andalusia front.

History 
The unit was created on May 1, 1937 from troops from the old Maroto Column and recruits from the reserves. The first commander of the 147th MB was Francisco Maroto del Ojo, former commander of the Maroto column. Subsequently, the unit was assigned to the 23rd Division. For most of the war, the brigade did not intervene in relevant military operations. On March 20, 1938, it intervened in a small attack that sought to regain lost positions near Higuera de Calatrava, although the attempt failed. A few months later, on November 19, one of its battalions stormed a nationalist position. The 147th MB disappeared with the end of the war, in March 1939.

Command 
 Commanders
 Francisco Maroto del Ojo;
 Mariano Elipe Rabadán;
 José Zarco Martínez;

 Commissars
 Antonio Vázquez Vázquez

See also 
 Maroto Column
 Mixed Brigades

References

Bibliography 
 
 
 
 
 

Military units and formations established in 1937
Military units and formations disestablished in 1939
Mixed Brigades (Spain)
Militarized anarchist formations